Eternamiente (Eternally) is Molotov's fifth album, which was released October 16, 2007. It's a compilation of four EPs, each one made by a member of the band individually, plus two new tracks. The EPs were released in the band's website and there was an online poll where the fans could vote for their favorite EP.

These EPs are Hasta la basura se separa by Micky Huidobro, El Plan de Ayala by Paco Ayala, Sintitolo by Tito Fuentes and Miss Canciones by Randy Ebright, each one containing 4 songs. The EPs' music vary in style, with Hasta la Basura Se Separa consisting of thrash metal and Miss Canciones consisting of rap metal.

The name Eternamiente is a play on the words "eternally" and "lie", and can be roughly translated as Eternalie. Although each member carried out their works separately, Randy Ebright participated in the four projects. Tito Fuentes did so in some songs.

This album received a Latin Grammy Award for Best Rock Vocal Album, Duo or Group at the Latin Grammy Awards of 2008.

Track list

Videos 

 Yofo
 Guácala Q Rico

References

Molotov (band) compilation albums
2007 compilation albums
Universal Music Mexico albums
Latin Grammy Award for Best Rock Album by a Duo or Group with Vocal
Albums produced by Robert Carranza